In the 2022–23 season, Partizan Mozzart Bet competed in the Serbian League, Radivoj Korać Cup, Adriatic League and EuroLeague.

Players

Current roster

Players with multiple nationalities
   Kevin Punter
    Tristan Vukčević

Depth chart

On loan

Roster changes

In

|}

Out

|}

Competitions

Overall

Overview

Pre-season and friendlies

VTB Cup

Adriatic League

Regular season

Matches

EuroLeague

Regular season

Matches

Radivoj Korać Cup

Individual awards

Adriatic League

MVP of the Round

 Mathias Lessort – Round 21

Euroleague

MVP of the Round

 Dante Exum – Round 27

References

KK Partizan seasons
Partizan
2022–23 in Serbian basketball by club
2022–23 EuroLeague by club